Roxy Music is the debut studio album by English rock band Roxy Music, released on 16 June 1972 by Island Records.

It was generally well received by contemporary critics and made it to number 10 in the UK Albums Chart.

Music and lyrics 

The opening track, "Re-Make/Re-Model", has been labelled a postmodernist pastiche, featuring solos by each member of the band echoing various touchstones of Western music, including The Beatles' "Day Tripper", Duane Eddy's version of "Peter Gunn", and Wagner's "Ride of the Valkyries"; the esoteric "CPL 593H" was supposedly the licence number of a car spotted by Bryan Ferry that was driven by a beautiful woman. Brian Eno produced some self-styled "lunacy" when Ferry asked him for a sound "like the moon" for the track "Ladytron". "If There Is Something" was covered by David Bowie's Tin Machine, and was later featured quite extensively, almost as a central figure, in the British film Flashbacks of a Fool.

Several of the album's songs were thematically linked to films. "2HB", with its punning title, was Ferry's tribute to Humphrey Bogart and quoted the line "Here's looking at you, kid" made famous by the 1942 film Casablanca; "Chance Meeting" was inspired by David Lean's Brief Encounter (1945). "The Bob" took its title from Battle of Britain (1968) and included a passage simulating the sound of gunfire.

Discussing the music, Andy Mackay later said "we certainly didn't invent eclecticism but we did say and prove that rock 'n' roll could accommodate – well, anything really".

Production and cover art 

The band had been rehearsing and re-working the songs for a couple of months before they finally found a recording place, after which the entire album was recorded in the space of a single week. This was necessary because there was no record deal as yet, and their managers at EG were financing the sessions themselves, paying £5,000 in recording fees. The album was produced by King Crimson's lyricist Peter Sinfield, who had recently left that band. In May 1972, a few weeks after the recording sessions, a contract was signed with Island Records and in June the album was released.

The band's penchant for glamour was showcased both in the lyrics and in the 1950s-style album cover. The photographer Karl Stoecker shot the cover, featuring model Kari-Ann Muller, who later married Chris Jagger, brother of Mick Jagger (a stylised portrait of Kari-Ann Muller also graces the cover of Mott the Hoople's 1974 album The Hoople). The album was dedicated to Susie, a drummer who auditioned for Roxy Music in the early days.

Release 

Roxy Music, particularly the album's LP incarnation, has been released in different packages over the years. The album's original cover, as issued in 1972 by Island Records, featured a gatefold sleeve picturing the band (including original bass guitarist Graham Simpson) in stage attire designed by Antony Price, and did not include the track "Virginia Plain". The album's original US release, in late 1972 on Warner Bros. Records' Reprise subsidiary, included "Virginia Plain", which had since been issued as a single in the UK. The original US release also featured a gatefold sleeve, but replaced Simpson's photo with that of Rik Kenton, who played bass on "Virginia Plain" following Simpson's departure from the group.

US distribution of Roxy Music was transferred from Reprise to their affiliated company Atco Records in 1976, and back to Reprise in the mid-1980s. LP editions of the album pressed in these timeframes were without the gatefold sleeve and band photographs, instead providing liner notes on the rear album cover.

The original LP release did not contain any singles. In July 1972, a few weeks after the contract was signed, Roxy Music recorded two more songs, "Virginia Plain" and "The Numberer", that were released as a single. It peaked at No. 4 in the UK Singles Chart and helped push sales of the album, which itself went to No. 10. In most later repressings of the album, including CD versions, the song "Virginia Plain" has been included.

Versions of all nine tracks of the UK album were recorded by the BBC for the John Peel show on 4 January and 23 May 1972, with the earlier session featuring David O'List on guitar.

Critical reception 

Reviewing for Creem in 1973, Robert Christgau said: "From the drag queen on the cover to the fop finery in the centerfold to the polished deformity of the music on the record, this celebrates the kind of artifice that could come to seem as unhealthy as the sheen on a piece of rotten meat. Right now, though, it's decorated with enough weird hooks to earn an A for side one. Side two leans a little too heavily on the synthesizer (played by a balding, long-haired eunuch lookalike named Eno) without the saving grace of drums and bassline."

Around the time of the release of Roxy Music's third album Stranded, Ferry was quoted as saying that he did not like the odd production of Roxy Music and was re-recording many of its tracks. Ferry eventually re-recorded "Re-Make/Re-Model", "2HB", "Chance Meeting" and "Sea Breezes", and released them as B-sides to some of his solo singles between 1973 and 1976, collecting them together on his 1976 solo album Let's Stick Together.

In 1994, Roxy Music was ranked number 57 in Colin Larkin's All Time Top 1000 Albums. He described the album as "totally original and a breath of bizarre air", noting that it "put Bryan Ferry and Eno at the forefront of the art-rock movement." In 2003, Rolling Stone included the album at number 62 in its list of the best debut albums of all time and stated: "In England in the early Seventies, there was nerdy art-rock and sexy glam-rock and rarely did the twain meet. Until this record, that is." Uncut placed it at number nine on its 2015 list of the best debut albums. In 2005, Q included Roxy Music at number 31 in a list of "40 Cosmic Rock Albums" published in its special issue Pink Floyd & the Story of Prog Rock. In 2012, Treble named it as one of 10 "essential" glam rock albums.

Track listing

Original UK release

US release

Super Deluxe Edition
In March 2018, a Super Deluxe 3CD + 1DVD "Book Set" of the debut album Roxy Music was released containing previously unheard material, original 1971 demos, the original album plus alternate takes, contemporary BBC Sessions and a DVD containing rare video footage and a 5.1 surround mix by Steven Wilson, along with a 136-page hardback book with an essay by Richard Williams, including many rare and unpublished photographs. All are within a heavy-duty slipcase.

'Disc One: Original Album'

'Disc Two: Demos & Out-takes'

'Disc Three: The BBC Sessions'

'Disc Four: DVD VIDEO CONTENT'

Personnel (Original album)

Roxy Music
 Bryan Ferry – vocals, piano, Hohner Pianet, Mellotron
 Brian Eno – VCS3 synthesizer, tape effects, backing vocals
 Andy Mackay – oboe, saxophone, backing vocals
 Phil Manzanera – electric guitar
 Paul Thompson – drums
 Graham Simpson – bass guitar
 Rik Kenton – bass guitar on "Virginia Plain" (added to the album's North American release)

 Production
 Roxy Music – arrangement
 Peter Sinfield – production
 Andy Hendriksen – engineering, mixing

Personnel (40th anniversary deluxe reissue)

Roxy Music
 Bryan Ferry – vocals, piano, Hohner Pianet, Mellotron
 Brian Eno – VCS3 synthesizer, tape effects, backing vocals
 Andy Mackay – oboe, saxophone, backing vocals
 Phil Manzanera – electric guitar
 Paul Thompson – drums
 Graham Simpson – bass guitar (CD1: All except Track 4, CD2: Tracks 1–14, CD3: Tracks 1–5, DVD 5.1 Mix: All except Track 4)
 Rik Kenton – bass guitar (CD1: Track 4, CD2: Track 15, CD3: Tracks 6–14, DVD: All videos, 5.1 Mix: Track 4)
 Roger Bunn – electric guitar (Super Deluxe Edition: Disc Two, Tracks 1–4)
 Dexter Lloyd – drums (Super Deluxe Edition: Disc Two, Tracks 1–4)
 David O'List – electric guitar (Super Deluxe Edition: Disc Three, Tracks 1–5)

 Production
 Roxy Music – arrangement
 Peter Sinfield – production
 Andy Hendriksen – engineering, mixing

Charts

Certifications

References 

 Sources

External links 

 

Roxy Music albums
1972 debut albums
Albums produced by Peter Sinfield
Island Records albums
Polydor Records albums
Atco Records albums
Reprise Records albums
Virgin Records albums
E.G. Records albums